The Anzuetoi arboreal alligator lizard (Abronia anzuetoi), also known commonly as Anzueto's arboreal alligator lizard,  is a species of lizard in the family Anguidae. The species is endemic to Volcán de Agua in Guatemala.

Etymology
The specific name, anzuetoi is in honor of Guatemalan naturalist Roderico Anzueto, who collected the holotype.

Conservation status
The extent of occurrence of A. anzuetoi is approximately 24 km2 (9.3 mi2), and thus the species is considered Vulnerable by the IUCN. Anthropogenic impact is minimized by the fact that its native habitat has many landmines, and surrounding coffee plantations have been abandoned.

Habitat

Behaviour
A. anzuetoi is a diurnal tree-dwelling lizard. Dominant males exhibit territorial behaviour.

Reproduction
A. anzuetoi is viviparous.

References

Further reading
Campbell JA, Frost DR (1993). "Anguid lizards of the genus Abronia: revisionary notes, descriptions of four new species, a phylogenrtic analysis, and key". Bulletin of the American Museum of Natural History (216): 1–121. (Abronia anzuetoi, new species, p. 22). (in English with an abstract in Spanish).
Köhler G (2000). Reptilien und Amphibien Mittelamerikas, Band 1: Krokodile, Schildkröten, Echsen [= Central American Reptiles and Amphibians, Volume 1: Crocodiles, Turtles, Lizards]. Offenbach, Germany: Herpeton, Verlag. 158 pp. . (Abronia anzuetoi, p. 38). (in German).

Abronia
Vulnerable animals
Reptiles of Guatemala
Endemic fauna of Guatemala
Reptiles described in 1993
Taxa named by Jonathan A. Campbell
Taxa named by Darrel Frost